{{DISPLAYTITLE:C25H24N2O2}}
The molecular formula C25H24N2O2 may refer to:

 JWH-200, an analgesic chemical from the aminoalkylindole family
 QUCHIC, a designer drug offered by online vendors as a cannabimimetic agent